Iḷisaġvik College is a public tribal land-grant community college in Utqiaġvik (formerly Barrow), Alaska.  Operated by the North Slope Borough, a home rule government of the Iñupiat, it is the only tribally controlled college in Alaska, and it is the northernmost accredited community college in the United States. The college is located within the boundaries of the North Slope. It is an  region of Arctic tundra. It is connected to the  Dalton Highway only during the winter, by an ice road for local residents. The community can also be reached by plane. 

The college is a member of the American Indian Higher Education Consortium, and it offers a bachelor's degree in business administration, associate's degrees, one-year certificates, and adult education courses for GED preparation. In 2020, the school's Alaska Dental Therapy Educational Program became the first program in the United States to be fully accredited by the Commission on Dental Accreditation.

History

Iḷisaġvik College (IC) was renamed in 2005. It had been developed in alliance with the University of Alaska Fairbanks, beginning in 1986. Like other tribal colleges, it is a result of the Native American and Alaskan Native self-determination movement that expanded in late 1960s and early 1970s. The North Slope Borough was organized as a home rule government in 1972, and with that, the Iñupiat people took other steps toward regaining control of their culture. 

The college was created to satisfy higher education needs of Alaskan Natives and American Indians. IC generally serves geographically isolated populations that have no other means accessing higher education. Beginning in 1986, the North Slope Borough had worked with the University of Fairbanks to create the North Slope Higher Education Center. 

In 1995 the Borough passed an ordinance incorporating Iḷisaġvik College as a public and independent non-profit corporation. The school moved to the facility previously used by the United States Naval Arctic Research Laboratory (NARL). In 1996, IC took over the Iñupiat Heritage Center. In 1997 the school changed its name to Arctic Sivunmun Iḷisaġvik College. It was led from 1995 to 2005 by college president, Edna Ahgeak MacLean (Iñupiat) an educator from Utqiaġvik (Barrow). Iḷisaġvik College was a leader in 1997 in founding the Consortium for Alaska Native Higher Education (CANHE).

In 2005, the North Slope Borough established IC, the first, and still the only, Tribal College in the state of Alaska. It was federally recognized in 2007 as the 36th tribal college in the United States and designated as a land-grant college the following year.

Presidents
IC has been led primarily by indigenous educators, who have mostly been local Iñupiat people.  Brooke Gondara is Northern Cheyenne, and Justina Wilhelm.

Academics
Accredited in 2003 by the Northwest Commission on Colleges and Universities, the college offers a bachelor's degree in business administration, associate's degrees, one-year certificates, and adult education courses for GED preparation. Academic programs at IC reflect local Iñupiat traditions, values, and culture. They are also intended to provide training for career and employment opportunities.

In 2018, then-President Brower discussed the hope of expanding a current program into the school's second bachelor's degree program in elementary education with an indigenous focus. In 2020, the college's Alaska Dental Therapy Educational Program became the first program in the United States to be fully accredited by the Commission on Dental Accreditation. The program opened in 2004 and, by 2017, had increased oral healthcare services via Tribal Health Services by 40,000 people, mainly in rural populations across the state.

Partnerships
IC is a member of the American Indian Higher Education Consortium (AIHEC), a community of tribally and federally chartered institutions that work to strengthen and lead tribal communities in higher education.

Governance
Iḷisaġvik College is sanctioned by the Inupiat Community of the Arctic Slope (ICAS) tribal government. Iḷisaġvik College weaves Iñupiaq values into all its activities because it believes these values make its students and educational community stronger, more cohesive and more successful. Being true to the core values of the culture it predominantly serves helps to make Iḷisaġvik a valued and contributing member of that culture. By helping to strengthen the language and traditions of the Iñupiat, Iḷisaġvik fulfills its role as a distinctly indigenous institution that aims to enhance the local culture, while helping its students gain a foothold in the economy of the 21st century. Iḷisaġvik's goal is to create successful graduates who can incorporate their traditional values into modern life and, in doing so, enhances both.

Campus

The Tuzzy Consortium Library is  named after Evelyn Tuzroyluk Higbee, a member of the original Board of Higher Education for the college.

The campus is located in the former complex of the Naval Arctic Research Laboratory.

See also
 Point Barrow

References

External links
 

1986 establishments in Alaska
American Indian Higher Education Consortium
Buildings and structures in North Slope Borough, Alaska
Community colleges in Alaska
Education in North Slope Borough, Alaska
Educational institutions established in 1986
Inupiat culture
Non-profit organizations based in Alaska
Universities and colleges accredited by the Northwest Commission on Colleges and Universities
Utqiagvik, Alaska